Gu Siyu (born 11 February 1993) is a Chinese track and field athlete who competes in the discus throw and formerly the shot put. She was a double Asian junior champion in 2010 and represented her country at the 2013 World Championships in Athletics.

Career
Gu began to make her first impact at the age of sixteen, when she took the discus title at the 2009 Australian Youth Olympic Festival. She threw beyond fifty metres in the discus for the first time that year. International medals followed at the 2010 Asian Junior Athletics Championships where she claimed a shot put/discus double for China. She took the silver medal in the shot put later that year at the Summer Youth Olympics.

The focus of her 2011 season was the Chinese City Games and she was the shot put runner-up behind Guo Tianqian, who was the world youth champion that year. Both these marks ranked her in the top five juniors globally that year.

She was far off this form at the 2012 World Junior Championships in Athletics and her best of nearly five metres less was only enough for fifth.

Gu, dropping the shot put to focus on discus throwing instead, placed herself among the senior elite in the 2013 season. She earned her first senior selection for China as a result, but at the 2013 World Championships in Athletics she failed to register a valid mark and dropped out at the qualifying stage.

Personal bests
Shot put –  (2011)
Discus throw –  (2013)
Shot put (indoor) –  (2012)

International competitions

References

External links
 
 

Living people
1993 births
Chinese female discus throwers
Chinese female shot putters
World Athletics Championships athletes for China
Athletes (track and field) at the 2010 Summer Youth Olympics
21st-century Chinese women